The 2023 SaskTel Tankard, the provincial men's curling championship for Saskatchewan, was held from February 1 to 5 at the Affinity Place in Estevan, Saskatchewan. The winning Kelly Knapp rink represented Saskatchewan at the 2023 Tim Hortons Brier in London, Ontario where they finished fourth in Pool A with a 4–4 record.

Qualification process

Teams
The teams are listed as follows:

Knockout brackets
Source:

A event

B event

C event

Knockout results
All draw times listed in Central Time (UTC−06:00).

Draw 1
Wednesday, February 1, 7:30 pm

Draw 2
Thursday, February 2, 9:00 am

Draw 3
Thursday, February 2, 3:00 pm

Draw 4
Thursday, February 2, 7:30 pm

Draw 5
Friday, February 3, 10:00 am

Draw 6
Friday, February 3, 3:00 pm

Draw 7
Friday, February 3, 7:30 pm

Draw 8
Saturday, February 4, 10:00 am

Draw 9
Saturday, February 4, 3:00 pm

Playoffs
Source:

A vs. B
Saturday, February 4, 7:30 pm

C1 vs. C2
Saturday, February 4, 7:30 pm

Semifinal
Sunday, February 5, 10:00 am

Final
Sunday, February 5, 3:00 pm

References

2023 in Saskatchewan
Curling in Saskatchewan
2023 Tim Hortons Brier
February 2023 sports events in Canada
Sport in Estevan